Douglasdale refers to:

The valley of the Douglas Water in Lanarkshire, Scotland
Douglasdale, Gauteng, a residential suburb of Johannesburg, South Africa
Douglasdale/Douglasglen, Calgary, a neighbourhood of Calgary, Alberta, Canada